Conscious Roots (full title: Conscious Roots: The Awakening of the Aotearoa roots movement) was released in 2004. The album is the 1st edition of the (NZ) series.

Conscious Roots comprises a mixture of classic roots, fused styles, genre busters, and beautiful raw acoustic songs. It showcases the growing full band live roots music scene in Aotearoa / New Zealand.

Track listing
"Though We Are" - Unity Pacific
"Get Away" - Katchafire
"Miracles" - Cornerstone Roots
"Black Sunrise" (House of Shem Remix) - The Black Seeds featuring Te Omeka Perkins
"Bag of Money" - Barnaby
"Barely Can See" - Kora
"Are You Strong" - Unity Pacific
"Problems" - Salmonella Dub
"Call To You" - Trinity Roots
"Hope" - Fat Freddy's Drop
"Hold Tight" - Che Fu
"From Street to Sky" - Tigilau Ness
"Light" - Cornerstone Roots

References

Compilation albums by New Zealand artists
2004 compilation albums
Reggae compilation albums
EMI Records compilation albums